Charles S. Foos Elementary School, also known as Douglass and Weiser School, is a historic elementary school building located at Reading, Berks County, Pennsylvania.  It was built in 1903 and was expanded and renovated in 1912. A small addition was built in 1921. It was originally in the Romanesque Revival style, but transformed to the Classical Revival style with the renovations.  The "C"-shaped brick building contains 21 classrooms and an auditorium that seats over 200.  The school closed in 1979. Part of the very large school building is now a nursery school, and part condominiums.

It was listed on the National Register of Historic Places in 1983.  It is located in the Queen Anne Historic District.

References

Buildings and structures in Reading, Pennsylvania
School buildings on the National Register of Historic Places in Pennsylvania
School buildings completed in 1921
Schools in Berks County, Pennsylvania
Historic district contributing properties in Pennsylvania
National Register of Historic Places in Reading, Pennsylvania
1903 establishments in Pennsylvania